The Gibraltar national futsal team represents Gibraltar in international futsal competitions such as the FIFA Futsal World Cup and the European Championships and is controlled by the Gibraltar Football Association.

Tournament records

FIFA Futsal World Cup

UEFA European Futsal Championship

Current squad

References

Football
European national futsal teams
Association, Gibratar Football
1895 establishments in Gibraltar

ru:Футбольная ассоциация Гибралтара